Mick Morris (4 June 1882 – 3 August 1959) was an Australian rules footballer who played with Essendon in the Victorian Football League (VFL).

Notes

External links 

1882 births
1959 deaths
Australian rules footballers from Victoria (Australia)
Essendon Football Club players